SS Victor Herbert was a Liberty ship built in the United States during World War II. She was named after Victor Herbert, a composer, conductor, and founder of the American Society of Composers, Authors and Publishers (ASCAP).

Construction
Victor Herbert was laid down on 30 June 1943, under a Maritime Commission (MARCOM) contract, MC hull 1532, by J.A. Jones Construction, Panama City, Florida; she was launched on 22 August 1943.

History
She was allocated to Marine Transport Lines, Inc., on 15 September 1943. On 6 December 1946, she was sold to France, for $544,506. She was scrapped in 1963.

References

Bibliography

 
 
 
 

 

Liberty ships
Ships built in Panama City, Florida
1943 ships
Liberty ships transferred to France